"Modern Day Romance" is a song written by Kix Brooks and Dan Tyler and recorded by American country music group Nitty Gritty Dirt Band.  It was released in June 1985 as the lead single from the album Partners, Brothers and Friends.  The song was The Nitty Gritty Dirt Band's second number one on the country chart.  The single went to number one for one week and spent a total of fifteen weeks on the country chart.

Music video
The music video was directed by Gary Amelon.

Charts

Weekly charts

Year-end charts

References

1985 singles
1985 songs
Nitty Gritty Dirt Band songs
Songs written by Kix Brooks
Songs written by Dan Tyler
Song recordings produced by Paul Worley
Warner Records singles